SouthPark is an area edge city in Charlotte, North Carolina, United States. Its name is derived from the upscale SouthPark Mall, which opened on February 12, 1970. At nearly 1.8 million square feet, SouthPark Mall is the largest shopping mall in Charlotte and all of the Carolinas. The area is geographically centered at the intersection of Fairview Road and Sharon Road in the south central sector of the city, about six miles south of Uptown Charlotte. In addition to being home to the mall, SouthPark is also a residential area and one of the larger business districts in Charlotte. SouthPark is typical of the mixed-use developments found in many larger cities.

History
The neighborhood was once a part of a  farm owned by former North Carolina Governor Cameron Morrison.
The front entrance to the mall is on Sharon Road, with The Village at SouthPark and Belk Department Store anchoring each side of the front drive. Debuting in 2007 with 150 boutique apartments above boutique retail including North Carolina's first Crate & Barrel, The Village at SouthPark marked one of the first "Live, Work, Play" projects by Simon Property Group In the country. In the early 2000's, the Ivey family sold to Dillards, and the Belk Family sold to Sycamore Group of New York in the 2010s - both families notably conceptualized SouthPark Mall in the 1960s as anchoring the new edge city to be built on the 3,000 acre country farm owned by Governor Morrison. The English Country Manor House still exists today, in its original location in the-now Deering Oaks subdivision. Like Barclay Downs and Foxcroft, there are no markers naming the first subdivisions to be built directly adjacent to his homestead. Coming from the Myers Park school campuses on Colony Road, take a left on Richardson Drive, veering right into the private drive between the masonite fence posts boasting Turkeys on top. These marked the original entrance to Morrocroft before being developed. To the right, is the former horse stables/carriage house - now a single-family home. Straight ahead is the Manor. This upper-section of Deering Oaks, traditionally being the most private in SouthPark, is also a popular stretch for walking/running leisure along the SouthPark Corridor. The neighborhood, Morrocroft, comes from the original name Morrison gave the farm.

Demographics

As of 2010, SouthPark had a population of 16,549. The racial makeup of the neighborhood was 89.1% White American, 3.7% Black or African American, 2.5% Asian American, and 1.6% of some other race. Hispanic or Latino American of any race made up 3.1% of the population. The median household income for the area was $90,851.

Transportation infrastructure

Mass transit
The following buses from the Charlotte Area Transit System (CATS) serve SouthPark:
 #19 (Park Road)
 #20 (Sharon Road)
 #29 (UNC Charlotte/Crosstown)
 #30 (Woodlawn/Crosstown)
 #57 (Archdale/SouthPark)

SouthPark serves as a transit hub with the SouthPark Community Transit Center, which is located on the parking deck of the SouthPark Mall, between Belk and Dillard's. The hub also serves as a transfer point to several stations along the Lynx Blue Line light rail.

Roads
Fairview Road (which turns into Tyvola Road going west and Sardis Road going east), Colony Road, Park Road, Sharon Road, Sharon Lane, and Morrison Boulevard are important thoroughfares in SouthPark. Interstate 77 also serves SouthPark via Tyvola Road at exit 5. Commuters rely on car transportation and congestion is common during rush hour.

Economy
SouthPark is the home to the Fortune 300 company Nucor, as well as Dixon Hughes Goodman, National Gypsum, Coca-Cola Bottling Co. Consolidated, AmWINS Group, Carolinas AGC and Piedmont Natural Gas. Fluor, Bank of America Mortgage, First Citizens Bank, SunTrust Banks and CSX have major divisional operations located in SouthPark. The area is also home to the flagship store of grocer Harris Teeter.

Shopping
Within the limits of SouthPark, the upscale SouthPark Mall features many high-end designers and boutiques such as Burberry, Tiffany & Co, Louis Vuitton, Gucci, and Yves Saint Laurent. SouthPark Mall is also anchored by Dillard's (formerly Ivey's), the flagship store for Belk, North Carolina's second Nordstrom, the state's only Neiman Marcus, and Macy's (formerly Hecht's). Dick's Sporting Goods and The Container Store serve as additional anchors at the mall. The Village at SouthPark, located adjacent to the Dillard's store, features Crate & Barrel and restaurants. Other shopping complexes such as Phillips Place are within a close radius to SouthPark Mall and feature a diverse mix of tenants including Taylor Richards & Conger, Allen Edmonds, Brooks Brothers, Orvis, and a Restoration Hardware Gallery.

In 2011 SouthPark Mall was the most congested shopping mall in the United States during Black Friday weekend.

Healthcare
Carolinas Medical Center, owned and operated by Atrium Health, serves SouthPark and surrounding areas. Atrium Health recently opened a new medical office complex within SouthPark featuring a medical office tower and freestanding emergency department.

Education and library

School systems
Residents of SouthPark attend Charlotte-Mecklenburg Schools, including Beverly Woods Elementary, Selwyn Elementary, Sharon Elementary, Smithfield Elementary, Alexander Graham Middle, Carmel Middle, Quail Hollow Middle, Myers Park High School, Providence Day School and South Mecklenburg High School. Charlotte Country Day School is on the eastern edge of SouthPark

Library
SouthPark is served by the SouthPark branch of the Public Library of Charlotte and Mecklenburg County.

Sites of interest
Morrocroft Manor
The Upper Section of Deering Oaks at Richardson Drive and Beverwyck Road, Sharon Lane, Lemon Tree, Arborway and Foxcroft Road are the anchors of SouthPark Corridor's route for runners, and home to Charlotte's celebrities from Billy Graham's family to NASCAR's Jeff Gordon.
The architecturally notable Rotunda Building is located in SouthPark.
The architecturally notable Capitol Towers is located in SouthPark.
The Symphony Park amphitheater at SouthPark  is formerly home to Charlotte Symphony’s Summer Pops concerts. 
SouthPark Mall hosts an annual Christmas tree lighting on or around Thanksgiving Day.

See also
 Charlotte metropolitan area

References

External links

Neighborhoods in Charlotte, North Carolina
Economy of Charlotte, North Carolina